Josef is a variant of the masculine given name Joseph, notably used in Germany, Austria, Switzerland and the Czech Republic, and also in Scandinavia. People so named include:

 Josef Abrhám (born 1939), Czech film and stage actor
 Josef Albers (1888–1976), German Artist
 Josef Ludwig von Armansperg (1787–1853), Bavarian government minister, Regent and Prime Minister of Greece
 Josef Bühler (1904–1948), German Nazi government official executed for crimes against humanity
 Josef Dobrovský (1753–1829), Czech philologist and historian
 Josef Dietrich (1892–1966), German World War II Waffen-SS general and war criminal
 Josef Doležal (1920–1999), Czechoslovak race walker
 Josef Duchoslav (born 1967), Czech ice hockey player
 Josef Ertl (1925–2000), German politician
 Josef Frank (architect) (1885–1967), Austrian-born architect, artist, and designer
 Josef Fritzl (born 1935), Austrian sex offender
 Josef Gočár (1880–1945), Czech architect
 Josef Hladký (born 1962), Czech-German retired medley swimmer
 Josef Hoffmann (1870–1956), Austrian architect and designer of consumer goods
 Josef Hügi (1930–1995), Swiss footballer
 Josef Imbach (disambiguation)
 Josef Ježek, Czech politician
 Josef Jungmann (1773–1847), Czech poet and linguist
 Josef Kareis (1837–1913), Austrian electrical engineer and politician
 Josef Kjellgren (1907–1948), Swedish writer
 Josef Klaus (1910–2001), Austrian politician
 Josef Košťálek (1909–1971), Czech footballer
 Josef Kramer (1906–1945), German commandant of Bergen-Belsen concentration camp executed for war crimes
 Josef Krips (1902–1974), Austrian orchestral conductor
 Josef Lontscharitsch (born 1970), Austrian former road cyclist
 Josef Martínez (born 1993), Venezuelan footballer
 Josef Albert Meisinger (1899–1947), also known as the "Butcher of Warsaw", German Nazi SS and Gestapo officer executed for war crimes
 Josef Mengele (1911–1979), German World War II SS officer, physician and war criminal
 Josef Muller (disambiguation)
 Josef Václav Myslbek (1848–1922), Czech sculptor
 Josef Mysliveček (1737–1781), Czech composer
 Josef Newgarden (born 1990), American IndyCar Series driver
 Josef Oberhauser (1915–1979), German Nazi SS concentration camp commandant and Holocaust perpetrator
 Josef Odložil (1938–1993), Czech middle-distance runner
 Josef Samael or Josef (wrestler), ring names of professional wrestler The Sheik II
 Josef Schmid (disambiguation)
 Josef Schneider (disambiguation)
 Josef Schuetz, or Schütz, (born 1921), Lithuanian-German Nazi SS concentration camp guard
 Josef Schwammberger (1912–2004), Nazi SS forced labor camp commandant
 Josef Singer (1923-2009), Israeli President of Technion – Israel Institute of Technology
 Josef von Sternberg (1894–1969), Austrian-American film director born Jonas Sternberg
 Josef Strauss (1827–1870), Austrian composer, brother of Johann Strauss II
 Josef Suk (composer) (1874–1935), Czech composer and violinist
 Josef Suk (violinist) (1929–2011), his grandson, Czech violinist and conductor
 Josef Wüst (1925–2003), Austrian journalist, editor-in-chief and publisher
 Josef Sepp Zeilbauer (born 1952), Austrian former decathlete

See also
 Jozef
 Joseph

Masculine given names
Czech masculine given names
Danish masculine given names
German masculine given names
Norwegian masculine given names
Swedish masculine given names